State Road 159 (SR 159) is a short north–south road that serves as a southwestern bypass of Havana in Gadsden County between SR 12 and U.S. Route 27 (US 27).

The road continues north as County Road 159 (CR 159) to the Georgia border, where it becomes State Route 309. Another segment of County Road 159 can be found between US 90 near Midway and US 27 north of Scotland.

Route description
The highway begins at an intersection with US 27 southwest of downtown Havana. Immediately after the intersection there is a driveway for a store. The two-lane road makes a slight curve to the northwest crossing over a railroad. SR 159 ends shortly thereafter at a stop intersection with SR 12 across the street from a nursery.

Major intersections

References

External links

159
159
State highways in the United States shorter than one mile